Burnt Mill (or Burnt Mills) may be:

 Harlow
 Burnt Mill Lock
  Burnt Mill Bridge
 Burnt Mill Academy
 Burnt Mill railway station (Ireland)

See also
 Burnt Mills, Maryland